KITE VICTERS is an Indian state-owned free-to-air children's edutainment television channel  owned and operated by KITE Kerala under the Department of General Education and is wholly owned by the Government of Kerala. The channel is headquartered in Thiruvananthapuram, Kerala.

KITE VICTERS is an acronym for "Kerala Infrastructure and Technology for Education - Versatile Information and Communications Technology (ICT) Enabled Resource for Students". Along with Sun TV Network's Kochu TV, it is one of the two children's television channels in Malayalam (excluding Malayalam audio feeds in pan-India channels). The channel is broadcast on the state-operated GSAT-18 communications satellite.

KITE VICTERS PLUS

KITE VICTERS PLUS is the Second channel owned by KITE Kerala. It was launched on September 2021.
As part of the First Bell, Digital Classes for Pre- Primary to 12th Standard are being aired through KITE VICTERS channel. Despite being telecast 24/7 even with the repeats, the demand for more air-time for classes was felt significantly. It was in this context, it was decided to explore the possibility of a Second channel of KITE VICTERS using the existing bandwidth.

Establishment
Kerala Infrastructure and Technology for Education is the nodal agency for implementing the EDUSAT network and runs KITE VICTERS, the exclusive channel for education which is aired from 6 am to 11 pm. India's epoch making first broadband network on EDUSAT for schools, KITE VICTERS inaugurated by A P J Abdul Kalam, the president of India, on 28 July 2005 in Thiruvananthapuram.

The telecast of programs started in August 2006 through the assistance of EDUSAT network. The channel is telecasted for 17 hours a day from 6 am to 11 pm. KITE VICTERS offers interactive virtual classrooms that enable the school students as well as the teachers to directly communicate with the subject experts and educationists. It also ensures the dissemination of high-quality education to the students and teachers from the original source.

Programming and shows
 First Bell
 Shastra vicharam
 Keralam Mannum Manushyanum
 Jeevante thudippu
 Kaliyum karyvum
 Kerala yathra
 Paithrukam
 Vijnanadhaara
Padanakauthukam, Shastrakauthukam educational programmes
Examination oriented programme for SSLC and Plus 2 level
Beyond the text
Deutsche Welle Time
Drishya paadam
Global Three Thousand
Haritha Vidhyalayam
IT for All
Innalekalile Innu
Kadhaparayum Neram
Kerala Sree
Magic fingers
Mozhimuthukal
Naadavismayam
Ormayile Malayalam
Pusthakangalkkoppam
Shasthramuthukal
Tomorrow Today
Vazhikaatti

See also

 List of Malayalam-language television channels

References

 KITE VICTERS onboards Sun Direct, Tata Sky and Airtel Digital TV | DreamDTH

Malayalam-language television channels
Television channels and stations established in 2005
Television stations in Thiruvananthapuram
Government of Kerala
2005 establishments in Kerala